Kempen is a town in the district of Viersen, in North Rhine-Westphalia, Germany.

History
 1186: First mention in official documentation of Kempen as a place – the sovereign until 1794 is the Archbishop (electoral prince) of Cologne
 around 1290: Kempen is rebuilt as a fortified town
11 March 1294: First confirmation of Kempen as a town in official documentation
15th century: town blooms economically and culturally (population of approx. 4,200)
1542–1543: Kempen is the centre of the Reformation for the Lower Rhine
1579: The plague costs the town almost half of its inhabitants
1642: Kempen is conquered and destroyed by the allied French, Hessian and Weimar troops during the "Hessen War" (Thirty Years' War)
1794–1814: Kempen is under French rule. In the département of  Roer established in 1797, Kempen becomes a canton seat in 1798 and a French town in 1801.
1815: After the Congress of Vienna, Kempen becomes Prussian and is the county seat
1929: Due to local reforms, Kempen becomes the administrative seat of the county of Kempen-Krefeld
1966 onward: Restoration of the old town
1970: Communal restructuring: The communities of Hüls, St. Hubert, Tönisberg and Schmalbroich join Kempen along with the localities of St. Peter and Unterweiden to form a single town
1975: In further local reforms, Hüls is assigned to the city of Krefeld. The county of Viersen is formed and Kempen becomes part of "Kreis Viersen"
1984: The county seat is transferred from Kempen to Viersen.
1987: A cultural forum is opened in the Franciscan monastery after comprehensive restoration and renovation work.
11 March 1994: Date of the 700-year jubilee of the confirmation of Kempen as a town

Twin towns – sister cities

Kempen is twinned with:
 Wambrechies, France (1972)
 Orsay, France (1973)
 East Cambridgeshire, England, United Kingdom (1978)
 Werdau, Germany (1990)

Notable people
Thomas à Kempis (c. 1380–1471)
John Brugman (?–1473), Franciscan friar and preacher in Flanders
Wilhelm Hünermann (1900–1975), priest and writer
Adolph Moses Radin (1848–1909), rabbi
Isabel Varell (born 1961), actress and singer
Bernhard van Treeck (born 1964), psychiatrist and author
Tobias Koch (born 1968), pianist

Gallery

References

External links

 

Towns in North Rhine-Westphalia
Viersen (district)